Lo Mei-ling (born 1 May 1969) is a Malaysian-born Taiwanese politician. She was a member of the Nantou County Council from 2014 to 2020, when she was elected to the 10th Legislative Yuan. Lo followed Lin Li-chan as the second  to serve as a member of the Legislative Yuan.

Personal life and education
Lo was born in Malaysia on 1 May 1969. She attended Pay Fong Middle School before immigrating to Taiwan in 1987 to enroll within the Department of Geography at National Taiwan Normal University. Lo completed the Executive Master of Business Administration program at Providence University and pursued doctoral studies at the Department of Finance of the National Changhua University of Education. She acquired Taiwanese citizenship through marriage to a Taiwanese national.

Political career
Lo was elected to the Nantou County Council for the first time in 2014, as a political independent. She joined the Democratic Progressive Party for the 2018 election cycle, and was reelected. As a member of the county council, she advocated for the elderly living in low-income households. In November 2019, she was ranked fourth on the DPP party list, and won election to the 10th Legislative Yuan via proportional representation.

In May 2020, Lo advocated for stricter laws on fire safety. In November of that year, she founded a coalition to offer support for immigrants to Taiwan. In March 2021, Lo proposed that rescue services operate on a user-pay principle to dissuade unprepared tourists from visiting mountainous areas. In August 2021, she drew attention to suicide rates among adolescents, and advised that the Ministry of Education employ more guidance counselors as part of its suicide prevention efforts. That same month, she held a joint press conference regarding animal welfare and living conditions at pet shops and breeders. In October 2021, Lo proposed a basic law regarding the low birth rate in Taiwan. She continued advocating for children, expressing concern in the following month that the internet made minors more susceptible to sexual exploitation and abuse. In March 2022, Lo suggested that Article 31 of the Laws and Regulations Regarding Hong Kong & Macau Affairs be amended to prevent Chinese companies from claiming foreign or Hong Kong funding while doing business in Taiwan. During the 2022 Taiwanese local elections, she led the DPP campaign messaging efforts targeting immigrants and naturalized citizens.

References

Malaysian emigrants to Taiwan
Naturalised citizens of Taiwan
National Taiwan Normal University alumni
Democratic Progressive Party Members of the Legislative Yuan
Politicians of the Republic of China on Taiwan from Nantou County
21st-century Taiwanese women politicians
Living people
1969 births
Members of the 10th Legislative Yuan
Women local politicians in Taiwan
Party List Members of the Legislative Yuan